The following is a list of fictional United States presidents, S through T.

S

President Elaine Sallinger
 Presidency mentioned in: Red Dwarf novel Better Than Life
 Described as "perhaps the greatest American President of all time".
 Appears only as the fifth carving on Mount Rushmore.

President Robert Samuelson
 President in: the novel Red-12 by Louis A. Goth
 Guides the US (and the world) through a highly dangerous crisis precipitated by a nuclear explosion inside a Chinese satellite over the Pacific.
This causes tensions and mutual suspicions among the world's superpowers, and there are increasing indications of possible involvement by extraterrestrial beings.

President Newton Sanders
 President in: Mark Lawson's novel: Idlewild
 In a universe in which President John F. Kennedy survived the assassination attempt on his life, and went on to be re-elected in 1964, Newton Sanders wins the 1992 Presidential election running as a third party candidate - defeating both President George H. W. Bush and Bill Clinton.
 He is assassinated via a "baby bomb" (an infant wrapped in Semtex and detonated) by Yusaf Yusaf (alias "Anderson Kempinski Fraser"). As he did not have a Vice-President, he is succeeded by the Speaker of the House.

President Matt Santos
 President in: The West Wing (television series)
 A former mayor and three-term congressman from Houston, Texas.
Santos is married to Helen Santos and has two children.
He is preparing to retire from politics when he is approached by Josh Lyman about a presidential campaign.
He starts out the campaign in last place in a crowded field, before catapulting into third place after receiving 19% of the vote in the New Hampshire primary.
 Surging late after winning the California primary, Santos is deadlocked with the frontrunner, Vice President Bob Russell at the 2006 Democratic National Convention. Santos wins the party nomination on the fourth ballot and names former Labor Secretary and White House Chief of Staff Leo McGarry as his running mate.
 Santos's campaign is temporarily hobbled by the sudden death of Leo McGarry (written due to the real-life passing of McGarry's portrayer, actor John Spencer).
 Santos narrowly defeats Senator Arnold Vinick of California by a count of 272 to 266 electoral votes.
 Before his inauguration, Santos names his defeated rival Vinick his Secretary Of State, ensuring bipartisan cooperation and seeks the confirmation of Pennsylvania Governor Eric Baker as his Vice President.
 Second sitting U.S. Congressman to be elected to the Presidency after James A. Garfield.
 In the West Wing canon, Santos is the first Hispanic-American president.
 Played by: Jimmy Smits
 Party: Democratic

President Lee Sarason
 President in: It Can't Happen Here
 Chief political operative and adviser to Berzelius 'Buzz' Windrip as a Governor and U.S. Senator.
 U.S. Secretary of State during Windrip's presidency, during which time the United States is transformed into an authoritarian Corporatist country.
 Following the flight of the disillusioned Vice President Perley Beecroft to Canada, Sarason leads a coup which sees Windrip overthrown and exiled to France.
 Due to extravagance and relatively weak rule, Sarason is soon after killed in a bloody putsch at the White House organised by General Dewey Haik, who proclaims himself as the new President. Thereafter, a military dictatorship erodes Corporatist power, plunging the United States into civil war and a war with Mexico.
 Party: Corporatist (presumably, previously Democratic)

President James Sawyer
 President in: White House Down
 Proposes a controversial peace treaty with allied nations to both remove military forces from and provide significant financial aid to the Middle East. The controversy of the treaty prompts his own Vice President to announce his resignation in protest.
 Is in the White House when terrorists attack - led by his own Secret Service detail leader Martin Walker, whose son died during military deployment, and ex-Delta Force and CIA operator Emil Stenz. The attack is later revealed to have been masterminded by Eli Raphelson, the Speaker of the United States House of Representatives, who is allied with influential groups who stand to lose money should the peace deal go through.
 Is rescued by Capitol policeman John Cale, and along with him attempts to escape from the White House. 
 Presumed dead after an explosion in the White House cabana, but narrowly escapes. He is later shot defending a hostage, but survives when the bullet deflects off his pocket watch. 
 Married to Allison Sawyer, who is abroad in Paris during the events of the film. 
 Party: Democratic
 Played by Jamie Foxx

President Kenneth Saxon
 President in: Missing! (novel, 1969) by Michael Avallone.
 Elected in 1968
Defeated in 1972 by Robert Winslow Sheldrake.
 Party: Democratic

President Adam Northfield Scott
 President in: The Kidnapping of the President
 Revolutionaries kidnap him on a visit to Toronto, Canada.
 Played by: Hal Holbrook

President Nehemiah Scudder
 President in: Robert Heinlein's Future History, Scudder is elected President in 2012 and
Establishes a theocracy.
Holds no further elections.
Takes the title "Prophet" rather than "President".
Establishes a  new capital, New Jerusalem, in the Mid-West.
His descendants rule as "Prophets" for most of the 21st Century but grow increasingly corrupt and venal, finally overthrown in the novella If This Goes On—.
The new government declares a restoration of the Constitution of the United States "as it stood prior to the inauguration of President Scudder".
Heinlein planned, but never wrote, the story in which Scudder gains power, to be named "The Stone Pillow", but decided that it would be too depressing.
In Heinlein's earlier novel For Us, The Living: A Comedy of Customs (written 1939 but only published after Heinlein's death) Scudder attempts to be elected but his extensive use of Ku Klux Klan type thugs alarm many people and a counter-mobilization manages to forestall his election, thus in the earlier version the US avoids decades of theocracy.

President George Sears
 President in: Metal Gear Solid (unnamed in the game. Name given in Metal Gear Solid 2: Sons of Liberty).
 The 43rd president
George Sears is actually a pseudonym for Solidus Snake, a survivor of the Les Enfants Terribles project that also created protagonist Solid Snake and his nemesis Liquid Snake.
In the sequel Metal Gear Solid 2, he is revealed to be a former member of The Patriots (a secret group that controls the United States) and is the true mastermind behind the Shadow Moses island incident in 2005 (the fictional events of Metal Gear Solid).
He acts without permission from the Patriots and is forced to resign his Presidency.
Sears is succeeded by President James Johnson by the time of Metal Gear Solid 2.
 In an early draft of the Metal Gear Solid 2 story, George Sears is named George Ryan and the events of the game were meant to occur while Solidus was still in office.

President Phil Ken Sebben
 President in: Harvey Birdman, Attorney at Law special Harvey Birdman: Attorney General
 Has no memory of being elected president and is quickly impeached.
 Loose parody of Donald Trump.
 Played by: Stephen Colbert

President David Segovia
 President in: FlashForward, a 2009 ABC Television Series
 On October 6, 2009, during his second term, the entire human race passes out for one minute and seventeen seconds and experiences a future memory from April 29, 2010.
 During President Segovia's Flashforward, he is informed of some major event taking place.
 Played by: Peter Coyote

President William Lyons Selby
 President in: The Outer Limits episode "The Hundred Days of the Dragon"
 Vice President: Theodore Pearson
 Selby is assassinated before election and is replaced by a lookalike agent from an unnamed Asian government.
The Vice-President arrests the agent when the plot is discovered.
 Party: Not mentioned
 Played by: Sidney Blackmer

President Julian September
 President in: JLA #18 (05/1998)
September alters history to become President of the United States.
The JLA destroy his Engine of Chance, which only alters history further.

President Robert "Dakota Bob" Shaefer
 President in: The Boys
 Republican candidate in the 2000 election.
 Previously served as Vice President to George H. W. Bush after Dan Quayle 
 Heeds intelligence warnings about terrorist hijackings; was expecting 9-11, and orders that three of the hijacked planes be shot down.
 However, he is bludgeoned with a fire extinguisher; the vice-president subsequently orders that the fourth plane be allowed to proceed unmolested, so that superheroes sponsored by Vought-American Consolidated can rescue it. The failed rescue leads to the plane destroying the Brooklyn Bridge.
 Leads America into war against Afghanistan and Pakistan.
 He was killed by an angry wolverine released by his Vice President, Victor "Vic the Veep" Neuman, who then succeeded him.
 In the live-action adapted television series, Robert "Dakota Bob" Singer, played by Jim Beaver (the name change referring to his character Bobby Singer in Supernatural), is a Democrat and the U.S. Secretary of Defense campaigning for President. He appoints Congresswoman and Federal Bureau of Superhuman Affairs director Victoria Neuman (who, unbeknownst to him, is a Supe) as his running mate following the death of his first choice Senator Lamar Bishop (who was murdered by the Deep on the orders of Homelander in exchange for the whereabouts of his son, Ryan).

President John Shaw
 President in: Time Trax
 While serving as Secretary of State in 1993 he is the target of a time travelling assassin.
 By 2093 he is considered one of the three great Presidents along with Abraham Lincoln and Elaine Nakamura.
 Played by: Dorian Harewood

President James Kavanaugh Shea
 President in: The Godfather Returns and The Godfather's Revenge
 Former Governor of New Jersey.
 Born in 1919.
 Appoints his brother Daniel Brendan Shea to be his Attorney General.
 Presidential term from 1961-1964.
 Assassinated during the 1964 Democratic National Convention.
 Based on President John F. Kennedy.

President Shears
 President in: Traveler

President Robert Winslow Sheldrake
 President in: Missing! (novel, 1969) by Michael Avallone
 Born in Nebraska.
 Defeats incumbent President Kenneth Saxon in 1972.
 Is missing on Inauguration Day, January 20, 1973.
 Is found two days later curled up naked in an air duct after accidentally being given tea with an LSD laced sugar cube by his daughter.
 Party: Republican

President Andrew Shepherd
 President in: The American President
 A native of Wisconsin.
Avowed fan of the Green Bay Packers.
Shepherd went to Stanford University before teaching history at the University of Wisconsin.
He has a daughter named Lucy and is married to Mary Shepherd, who later dies of cancer.
As a bachelor president, Shepherd starts dating environmental lobbyist Sydney Wade of Virginia while running for re-election.
 Cannot get his best friend, Chief of Staff A.J. McInerney, to grant his simplest of requests, "Call me Andy" (as opposed to 'Mr. President'), even when they are playing pool. However, after two dates, Sydney grants his request.
 Orders the bombing of Libyan Intelligence Headquarters in retaliation for their bombing of an American missile defense system in Israel. Refuses to use the attack for political gain as he regrets the killing of the building's innocent night shift.
 Quote: "You want to claim this land as the land of the free? Then the symbol of your country cannot just be a flag. The symbol also has to be one of its citizens exercising his right to burn that flag in protest. Now show me that, defend that, celebrate that in your classrooms. Then you can stand up and sing about the land of the free."
 Party: Democratic
 Played by: Michael Douglas

President Sally Sheridan
 President in: XIII: The Conspiracy
 First female president.
 Presidential term 2009-2010.
 Assassinated whilst giving her Veterans Day speech in Raleigh, North Carolina.
 Vice President Joseph K. Galbrain replaces her.
 Her murder is later revealed to have been orchestrated by her brother Walter "Wally" Sheridan, and other members of the XIII group. Her death enables him to run for president, gaining support through the sympathy at the loss of his sister.
 A female version of President William B. Sheridan, who in the XIII comics was Walter Sheridan's brother. 
 Has opposing political views to her brother, Walter.
 Party: Democratic (presumably)

President Walter "Wally" Sheridan
 President in: XIII (comics) and XIII: The Conspiracy (TV film and series)
 Presidential term 2013-2014.
 Brother of anterior president William B. Sheridan (comics)
 Brother of anterior president Sally Sheridan (TV film and series)
 In the comics, these two powerful politicians and brothers are a comic version of John F. Kennedy and his brother Robert F. Kennedy. In the book, Wally is the mastermind behind the XIII conspiracy, which began with the assassination of his brother (a nod to the JFK murder). It would have culminated in the establishment of a dictatorship in the United States.
 In the TV film (XIII: The Conspiracy) and series (XIII: The Series) he has his sister killed and smears the reputation of her successor, Joseph K. Galbrain. He later runs for, and wins the national election, and comes closer to establishing a dictatorship in the United States.
 Resigns from office due to "health problems".
 Campaigns for the Republican nomination for President in the 2016 election when he is killed by Colonel Amos.
 Party: Republican
 Buried at the Walter Sheridan Presidential Library in Charlotte, North Carolina.

President Alexander George Sherman
 President in: The Genesis Machine (novel, 1978) by James P. Hogan
 Sherman is president in a near future where a western alliance is under pressure from, and losing territory in a domino-effect to an African-Asian axis.
A theoretical scientist creates a new mathematical model of the universe, and in doing so, creates an untraceable weapon that can restore the balance of world power.
 Instead of using the weapon to give superiority to the west, while President Sherman stands by in shock, the scientist destroys all weapons of mass destruction worldwide, and thus sets the stage for an enforced world peace.
 Party: Not mentioned

President William Shockley
 President in: First Family (movie, 1980)
 Serves as Vice President to Manfred Link.
 Becomes President after President Link and the First Family are declared "dead" by the U.S. Supreme Court after President Link attempts to sell U.S. citizens for a super-growth plant food.
 Dies from a panic-induced heart attack while taking the oath of office.
 President Shockley is given high marks for his master of the ship of state, albeit for some thirty seconds.
 Played by: Bob Dishy

President Angela Shostakovich
 President in: nightmare future in an episode of Mr. Belvedere
 President of the United States in 2040.
 Played by: Michele Matheson

President Bubba Shrub
 President in: Bikini Planet
 Played by: Richard Van Vleet

President Gordon Shumway
 President in: ALF – "Hail to the Chief" episode
 In a dream sequence, Kate dreams Alf is elected president, solves all the country's problems, and gets his face on Mount Rushmore.

President Will Signoff
 President in: The Adventures of Rocky and Bullwinkle movie

President Gene Simone
 President in: Shadowrun role-playing game
 Presidential term 2064-2069.
 10th UCAS President | 56th US President.
Senate President Pro Tempore prior to becoming President.
 Succeeds President Nadja Daviar after her disappearance soon after the end of the failed November 3 coup.
 VP Nadja Daviar had succeeded President Kyle Haeffner after his death during the coup, and the Speaker of the House was likewise incapable of assuming office.
 Succeeded by Angela Colloton (R) in 2069.

President Lisa Simpson
 President in: The Simpsons – "Bart to the Future" episode
 Native of Springfield.
 The first straight female president, Lisa is the incumbent president in the year 2030, after Donald Trump (though Trump himself would become the actual 45th president), Chaz Bono, and Ted Kennedy.
 At the end of the episode "The Kid Is All Right", Lisa Simpson is running for president in the 2056 presidential election against Isabel Gutierrez (Republican). During the debates, Simpson responds to Anderson Cooper's question about getting the United States out of the War in Afghanistan by saying she will throw in the towel and make Afghanistan a state.
 Lisa Simpson also becomes president in the episode "Mother and Child Reunion".
 Party: Democratic

President Will Simpson
 President in: The Insider by Jack Nesbit
 Two Term President of the United States.
 Appoints Senator Sam Adams Vice President after his first Vice President is killed when Air Force Two is shot down by terrorist.

President Charles H.P. Smith
 President in: November
 Played by: Nathan Lane
 Smith is an unpopular president up for re-election.

President David Roger "Dave" Smith
 President in: "The Unknown Law" by Avram Davidson (1963)
 The youngest President ever elected, being just thirty-five.
 Popular veteran of a war recently fought in Sumatra, loosely modeled on John F. Kennedy (President at the time of writing).
 Enters office directly into a major crisis:
The Cold War has spread into space, with the United States and Soviet Union staking rival claims in the Asteroid Belt.
On Earth an alliance of anti-US Latin-American nationalists has united all of South America and are spreading northwards into Panama.
 Faces a domestic crisis with Jim Macdonald, a political rival and former friend, trying to blackmail Smith into making him Secretary of Space. Macdonald intends to use this position to spark an all-out confrontation with the Soviets, unilaterally seizing disputed asteroids. If not given this position, he will plunge the just-inaugurated President into a major public scandal and destroy his credibility. Macdonald has been put up to this by his wife Sarra, a shrewd schemer and manipulator - who is the President's mistress.
 On the third day after inauguration, the President gets a visit from three officials who inform him of an "Unknown Law" inaugurated by George Washington and maintained secretly by all Presidents since: Once in a term, a President may order the assassination of a person who, in the President's judgement, constitutes a Clear and Present Danger to the Integrity of the Nation and against whom no evidence can be brought in a court. It had been invoked seventeen times in the history of the US, and the secret was always kept.
 After his initial shock, President Smith concludes that he must invoke the Unknown Law already on his third day in office.

President Robert "Bud" Smith
 President in: National Lampoon's Men in White
 Played by: Barry Bostwick

President Jennifer A. Smythe
 President in: The Probability Broach, as part of the North American Confederacy Series by L. Neil Smith, in which the United States becomes a libertarian state after a successful Whiskey Rebellion and George Washington being overthrown and executed by firing squad for treason in 1794.
 Serves as the 26th President of the North American Confederacy. 
 Serves as president from 1984 to 1992.
 She is the fourth woman to hold the office of the presidency after Harriet Beecher Stowe, Rose Wilder Lane, and Ayn Rand.
 Party: Gallatinist

President Sparrow
 President in: The Messiah of Morris Avenue
 Fourth Sparrow to occupy the religious right White House.

President Kathleen Spencer
 President in: Nikita
 Former Vice President to President Charles Grayson.

President Richard John Splett
 President in: Veep
 Second African American to hold the office after Kemi Talbot. 
 Born and raised in Lurlene, Iowa to a Catholic family.
 Attended both Yale University and the Illinois Institute of Technology, where he graduated with doctorates in both constitutional law and veterinary medicine, respectively.
 Married to First Lady Annette Splett. 
 Worked as a political assistant and adviser in Washington, D.C. early in his career, serving in the administration of President Selina Meyer, most notably in the Meyer campaign's efforts to win Nevada's Electoral College votes via a statewide recount in 2016, as well as working for future Vice President Jonah Ryan, including as his Communications Director during his election campaign to become U.S. Congressman for New Hampshire's 2nd district.
 Following Selina Meyer's departure from office, Splett worked for her private office and assisted both the Meyer and Ryan campaigns during the 2020 primaries.
 Briefly served as Mayor of Lurlene, Iowa.
He succeeded the previous ceremonial mayor, a dog, which had died after Selina Meyer fed it an unwanted chocolate.
His supervision of first response efforts after a cropduster crashed into a 7-Eleven saw him praised as a hero and his profile raised to a national level.
After he was approached by lobbyist Sidney Purcell to run for a seat in the Iowa Senate to advance the interests of a large pesticide company, he inadvertently disclosed that various members of the Iowa State Government including the Lieutenant Governor were accepting bribes whilst announcing to the press his decision not to run.
After the arrest of the incumbent, he is selected by Governor of Iowa Ballentine to serve as the new Lieutenant Governor albeit to sideline him through makework assignments out of fear that Splett was endeavouring to usurp him.
He ascended to the governorship after Governor Ballentine became blind and brain damaged after contracting shingles during a meeting with Jonah Ryan, who had contracted chickenpox.
Delivered the keynote speech at his party's 2020 National Convention, where he also served as a superdelegate and was described as the "future face of the party".
Served as the United States Secretary of Agriculture during the second presidency of Selina Meyer from 2021 to 2025 at the behest of Jonah Ryan. He fired his Chief of Staff Dan Egan as a condition of this appointment, thus ending Egan's career in politics.
Elected as president in 2040, he was awarded the Nobel Peace Prize for brokering a genius Three State Solution which curbed conflict in the Middle East. 
After his landslide re-election in 2044, he attends the funeral of former President Selina Meyer at her presidential library at Smith College, Massachusetts.
Acted as a sperm donor for Catherine Meyer and Majorie Palmiotti in the conception their son, who is also called Richard (Catherine and Majorie wished to raise him gender-neutral with a gender-neutral name, but Meyer announced to the press that the baby's name was Richard).
Implied to have been raised believing that his mother was his aunt and that his grandparents were his parents (having come to that conclusion himself).
In a non-canonical Vulture article written by David Mandel in 2020, Splett was appointed to the position of COVID-19 response co-ordinator by President Meyer (despite the outbreak in the United States taking place during what would have been President Montez's time in office).
Political Party: Democratic (implied)
Portrayed by: Sam Richardson

President Springhead
 President in: The Firesign Theatre's album: I Think We're All Bozos on This Bus
 Played by: Phil Austin
 A computer-controlled automaton, with a voice similar to Richard Nixon, answering questions from visitors to a World's Fair-like exhibition.
The President is "broken" when a visitor asks it a question that has no answer "Why does the porridge bird lay his eggs in the air?".

President Stanfield
 President in: The Trojan Horse
 Played by: Tom Skerritt
 He attempts to justify an invasion of Saudi Arabia in order to halt China's oil supply.

President James Stanford
 President in: xXx: State of the Union
 Played by: Peter Strauss
 His Secretary of Defense, George Deckert leads an unsuccessful military coup to assassinate him and seize power.
After Deckert's demise, Stanford gives the Medal of Honor to those that saved him while quoting Tupac Shakur: "Wars come and go, but my soldiers stay eternal."
 Party: Possibly Democratic

President Stanton
 President in: The Pet Shop of Horror Manga story Dual
 Uses a mystic element to become President of the United States.
 Vice President to President Manheim, and served during World War II.
 Is chosen by the mystic element to become President to use the Atomic Bomb to end the war.

President Arch Stanton
 President in: Planetfall
 Played by: Ted V. Mikels

President Jack Stanton
 President in: Primary Colors, book by Joe Klein and (movie, 1998)
 Stanton is a Democratic governor of a southern state. He appears to be a charming and philandering politician. He eats junk food and is portrayed as a thinly disguised pastiche of Bill Clinton.
 Played by: John Travolta
 Party: Democratic

President Roger Stanton
 President in: The Pet Shop of Horror Manga Story "Dual"
 An irresponsible and womanizing Former Congressman from California.
 Grandson of the President Stanton who ended World War II.
 Buys a mystic element to enhance his political career.
 The element puts the mind of his noble chief of staff into his body after an accident.
 As President he is a good husband and father, and leads the United States to its greatest power and influence.

President Richard Starkey
 President in: The Postman (movie, 1997)
 Unseen fictional president of a post-apocalyptic America attempting to rebuild, created by Kevin Costner's character.
 Note: Richard Starkey is the actual name of Beatles drummer Ringo Starr.

President Joseph Staton
 President in: American Dreamz
 2nd term president and guest judge on a weekly talent show.
 Character is a thinly veiled parody of George W. Bush.
 Played by: Dennis Quaid

President Thomas M. Staver
 President in: No Man's World by Martin Caidin
 In office in 1971.
 President as United States attempts to establish presence on Moon, where Soviet Union has had bases for three years.

President Mike Stearns
 President in: The 1632 series created by Eric Flint
 Former prize fighter and regional president of a mine workers' union.
 After the town of Grantville, West Virginia is thrown back in time to 17th-century Holy Roman Empire, during the Thirty Years' War, Stearns' leadership peacefully annexes dozens of central German cities and their environs to create the New United States.
 After unrest threatens to dissolve the loose Confederated Principalities of Europe of which the New United States is a powerful member, Stearns, in cooperation with its monarch Gustav II Adolf, becomes the founding Prime Minister of the nominally republican United States of Europe.

President Joe Steele
 President in: Joe Steele (novel, 2015) and (short story, 2003) of the same name by Harry Turtledove
 An alternate history version of Joseph Stalin in which his parents emigrated to the United States.
Steele becomes a Democratic congressman from Fresno, California. 
After bringing about the death of Franklin D. Roosevelt in a fire at the Governor's Mansion, Steele is elected President of the United States in the 1932, defeating incumbent Herbert Hoover. 
 He creates a brutal dictatorship while in office.
 Remains president for six terms and defeats.
Alf Landon in 1936
Wendell Willkie in 1940
Thomas E. Dewey in 1944
Harold Stassen in 1948
Robert A. Taft in 1952
In the short story, Steele runs unopposed in 1944, 1948 and 1952.
 Serves until his death from a stroke on March 5, 1953, and is succeeded by his 84-year-old vice president John Nance Garner. 
 In the short story, Garner is overthrown and executed shortly into his term by J. Edgar Hoover, who becomes another dictatorial president.
In the novel, Garner take over, but is impeached and retires to Texas while Hoover becomes the Director of the United States.

President Thomas Steele 
 President in: Shadowrun role-playing game
 Presidential term 2053–2057.
 Succeeds after President Alan Adams dies one day after his second inauguration in 2053.
 5th UCAS President | 51st US President.
 Speaker of the House Betty Jo Pritchard succeeds him in 2057 after the UCAS House of Representatives declares the UCAS Presidential Election of 2056 invalid, cancelling the second inauguration of incumbent President Thomas Steele and his VP-elect.
 Party: Democratic

President Diane Steen
 President in: Mafia!
 Married unknowingly to the nation's biggest mob boss.
 Played by: Christina Applegate

President Bryan Stegmeyer
 President in: Mobile Suit Gundam 00
 Effective leader of the Union of Solar Energy and Free Nations.

President Joseph Steppens
 President in: Salt (movie, 2010)
Parents and sister were killed in a plane crash in Russia in 1974, and it is implied that the real Joseph Steppens also dies in that crash and is replaced by a Soviet sleeper agent.
 A former appointed Vice President who replaces the late Vice President Maxwell Oates.
In the Extended Director's Cut, it is announced that President Steppens will travel to Moscow on for a Summit.

President Sterling
 President in: Dr. Dolittle: Tail to the Chief
 He has a daughter, Courtney (played by Elise Gatien).
 Played by: Peter Coyote

President David T. Stevens
 President in: Twilight's Last Gleaming (movie, 1977) based on Viper Three (novel, 1971) by Walter Wager
 A group of military convicts seizes control of an ICBM complex and demands:
$10 million.
The release of top secret documents regarding the Vietnam War.
and President Stevens as a hostage.
 President Stevens agrees to the demands, and gets the Secretary of Defense to promise he will release the documents should anything happen to him.
 The President is fatally wounded during a rescue attempt outside of the missile complex, and realizes at the last moment of his life that the Secretary of Defense will not release the documents.
 Played by: Charles Durning

President Stevenson
 President in: Veep
 Likely succeeded Ronald Reagan (the most recent real-life President mentioned in the series) and first elected in 1988.
 Mentioned by Selina Meyer as having a "bizarre indifference to Apartheid".
 In the episode "Library", he is seen attending the opening of the Stuart Hughes Presidential Library and Museum in 2018, catching Selina Meyer in a recreation of the Oval Office sitting at a cordoned-off replica of the Resolute desk.
 Played by: Robert Pine

President James Edward Stevenson
 President in: Turning Point: Fall of Liberty
 Nazi Supporter.
 Former Speaker of the House.
 He becomes the 35th President in 1953 after President Thomas E. Dewey and Vice President Haley resign after the Nazi's invasion of the East Coast of the United States.
 His first act in office is ordering all American armed forces and resistance groups to stand down.
 The American Resistance assassinates him.

President Jim Stevens
 President in: Term Limits by Vince Flynn
 Very corrupt.
 His administration disaffects anti-government special forces veterans.
 Party: likely Democratic

President Tom Steward
 President in: Hitman: Blood Money
 Pro-cloning president, targeted by "The Franchise" who want to maintain their own covert cloning program.
His Vice President Spaulding Burke is killed in a car crash organized by "The Franchise, who then after get Daniel Morris nominated to the VP position.
Attempted assassination is helped by his own vice president, Daniel Morris.
President Steward is to be assassinated in the White House by Mark Parchezzi III before Agent 47 intervenes.
 Plans to nominate third VP after Morris's death, but says he will not let Congress dictate his decision.
 Has strong support and high approval ratings, and defeats anti-cloning Democratic candidate, Frank Morgan, in the general election.
 Party: Republican

President Hamilton Stewart
 President in: Medusa by Jerry and Sharon Ahern
 Former Governor of New York.
 Wife's name is Susan.

President Digby R. Stewart
 President in: The Andropov Deception by Brian Crozier
 Former Actor, and close ally of British Prime Minister Brenda Barclay.

President Greg Stillson
 President in: The Dead Zone
 His Presidency and role is starting a nuclear Armageddon which is foreseen by psychic Johnny Smith.
 Stillson's presidency is prevented when Smith attempts to assassinate him during his run for Congress and he shields himself with a child.
 Party: Third Party Christian Conservative
 Played by: Martin Sheen

President Jim Stonecold
 President in: .hack
 44th President of the United States
 Resigns from office in January 2006 after the "Pluto's Kiss" computer virus brings about the collapse of the modern internet and nearly causes a nuclear catastrophe by activating the United States' nuclear defense and automated counter-strike systems on December 24, 2005.

President Bridget Strand
 President in: Death Stranding
 First female president and last president of the United States before the Death Stranding event.
 President of the surviving 'United Cities of America' until her death.
 Adoptive mother of the game's protagonist, Sam Porter Bridges
 Played by:
Lindsay Wagner (likeness and older voice)
Emily O'Brien (younger voice)

President Martin Suarez
 President in: DC Universe, as of DC Universe Decisions (2008)
He is publicly endorsed by Bruce Wayne as an attempt by Batman to get close to Suarez's campaign to uncover an assassination attempt.
 Party: Democratic

President Patrick J. Sullivan
 President in: My Uncle the Alien
 Played by: Dink O'Neal

President Paxton S. Superstoe
 President in: Superstoe by William Borden

President Not Sure (Joe Bauers)
 President in: Idiocracy
 Real name: Joe Bauers
 Mistakenly renamed "Not Sure" upon registering for American citizenship.
 Born sometime in the 20th Century.
While working as an army librarian, Bauers takes part in a military experiment which planned to freeze him for one year, however, due to an accident, he is frozen for 500 years.
 As Secretary of the Interior under President Camacho, Bauers helps end a major dust bowl.
At the end of the movie Bauers succeeds Camacho as president.
 Portrayed by Luke Wilson

President Jedidiah Surface
 President in: Lyerly 2044 by Demitri Green
 Vice President under President Preston Lyerly, appointed after Vice President Cole Tidwell's death.
 Former Senator from West Virginia.
 First gay president, married to Bernard Surface.
 Defeats Republican nominee Martin Reddings from Kansas in the 2052 Presidential Election.
 Political party: Democratic Party.

Dr. Wilbur Daffodil-11 Swain
 President in: Slapstick by Kurt Vonnegut
 Last President of the United States and King of Manhattan.
 He gives everyone new middle names that are nouns followed by a number hence his middle name "Daffodil-11". If someone has the same name and number they are your brother or sister, if they have the same name but different number it means they are a cousin. This system was designed to give people relatives and always have family. This system ultimately destroys the country because the families would start flocking to states and joining up and ignoring laws and creating their own communities.

President Gifford Swansea
 President in: The Probability Broach as part of the North American Confederacy series by L. Neil Smith
 The United States becomes a Libertarian state after a successful Whiskey Rebellion and George Washington being overthrown and executed by firing squad for treason in 1794.
 Serves as the eleventh President of the North American Confederacy.
 Presidential term 1852-1856.
 Arthur Downing succeeds him and he serves from 1856 until his death in 1859.

President June Syers
 President in: The Kid Who Became President
She says that she will be the second Franklin Delano Roosevelt.
She is the first woman and African American president.
 Term Length: January 2002-unknown.
 Party: Lemonade (fictional party)

T

President Oluwakemi 'Kemi' Talbot
 Former President in Veep
 First African-American to hold the office.
 Third female president after Selina Meyer and Laura Montez. 
 Born in Queens, New York City to a Nigerian mother and Norwegian father. 
 Involved in a serious car accident when she is 16, which resulting in the decapitation and death of her then boyfriend.
 Graduates summa cum laude from both Columbia University and Columbia Law School. 
 Marries Gordon Talbot, and has two adopted children; Lars and Abebi.
 Former political roles include:
Queens District Attorney
United States Attorney for the Southern District of New York
Member of the New York City Council
Queens Borough President
New York State Senator
United States Senator from New York.
 She is originally set to win the South Carolina primary, but Meyer in collusion with China rigs it in her favour through voter suppression targeting African American voters.
 Attempts to win the party nomination for president in 2020 during the brokered National Convention in Charlotte, North Carolina, but loses to former President Selina Meyer due to a number of compromising deals including promising to overturn same-sex marriage and appointing the populist, nativist Jonah Ryan as running mate. This is so that Meyer could avoid appointing Talbot as running mate (or to serve as Talbot's running mate herself).
 Is elected sometime between 2024 and 2040 for two consecutive terms.
 Attends the funeral of former President Selina Meyer in 2045, where she delivers the main eulogy.
 Political Party: Democratic (implied)
 Played by: Toks Olagundoye

President John Tanner
 President in the updated version of the Games Designer Workshop roleplaying game Twilight 2000.
 A former Governor of California, Tanner is elected in 1992 after George Bush decides not to run for a second term.
 In 1995, war breaks out between the Soviet Union and China, and in 1997 the war spreads to Europe.
 President Tanner is killed in the crash of Air Force One on Thanksgiving Day during a nuclear strike on Washington.
 His Vice President, Deanna Pembroke, is killed in the same attack and he is succeeded by Speaker of the House Munson.
 Party: Democratic

President Darius Tanz
 President in Salvation
 First British American President.
 Born to British parents on holiday in Philadelphia, which gives him birthright US citizenship in addition to British citizenship, thus rendering him eligible to hold the offices of Vice President and later President pursuant to Article 2 Section 1 of the United States Constitution. 
 Billionaire aerospace scientist and founder of Tanz Industries, which undertakes projects such as planning the Ark mission to Mars.
 Enlisted to aid the United States government in preventing a large asteroid from colliding with Earth and causing an extinction level event, as well as help against the rogue hacker group RE/SYST who aim to pit the United States and Russia against each other in the lead up to the collision.
 Appointed as Vice President by President Pauline Mackenzie after the arrest of treacherous former Vice President Monroe Bennett, primarily due to his non-political background, scientific knowledge and public popularity during the crisis. He is approved in an emergency sitting of Congress by a two thirds majority.
 Becomes President under the 25th Amendment after President Pauline Mackenzie is assassinated by a sniper after delivering a speech at the "Unity Rally". 
 Nominates two term congressman and former NASA shuttle pilot Trey Thompson as his Vice President. 
 When the railgun project his administration is working on to destroy the Samson asteroid is sabotaged by a doomsday cult, he resigns the presidency to focus his full attention on other options, and is replaced by Thompson. 
 Secret Service codename: Goliath. 
 Political Party: Independent (presumed)
 Played by: Santiago Cabrera

President Allan Trumbull
 President in Angel Has Fallen

President Taqu'il
 President in Frisky Dingo
 A superstar gangster rapper, he gains the Presidency through the Supreme Court, because the Democratic and Republican candidates, supervillain Killface, and billionaire superhero Xander Crews, respectively, are deemed ineligible
 Voiced by Killer Mike

President Allison Taylor
 50th President in: 24
 2013-2014.
 First female president; resigns at the end of Day 8 following a peace treaty conspiracy.
 Former United States Senator from Missouri; she wins the seat formerly held by her father.
 Played by: Cherry Jones
 Party: Republican

President Edward Taylor
 President in Impact, a 2008 television mini-series.
 President during a world threatening crisis caused by the collision of a brown dwarf star with the Moon.
 Played by Steven Culp

Acting President Nathan Templeton
 In Commander In Chief
 Speaker of the House who becomes Acting President for approximately one day, because President Mackenzie Allen (to whom he is a leading political foe) suffers a ruptured appendix requiring several hours of surgery and at least a day of recovery.
With his new position of power, he quickly forces an end to the airline labor strikes, undoing Allen's weeks of careful negotiations.
He later returns to speakership.
 Played by: Donald Sutherland
 Party: Republican

President Tempus
 President in Lois & Clark: The New Adventures of Superman.
 A recurring villain in the series.
Born in a distant future utopia, he hates the boredom of his society, and intends to prevent its rise by killing Superman.
He is also power hungry. In a two episode arc in the fourth season, he uses stolen future technology in order to brainwash the population of USA into electing him as President.
 Played by Lane Davies

President Benjamin Kirby "Ben 10,000" Tennyson
 President in the Ben 10: Ultimate Alien episode  Ben 10,000 Returns
 Becomes the president prior to this episode.
 Note that this would make the tagline "20 years from now" inaccurate, as that would make him 36 years old, and thus unqualified Constitutionally to have been elected. (minimum age is 35) However, "President of Earth" may have different qualifications.
 His tenure lasts "Just long enough to defeat the third Vilgaxian invasion".
 Voiced by: John DiMaggio

President Gwendolyn "Gwen" Tennyson
 President in: Ben 10,000 Returns
 Succeeds President Ben Tennyson prior to this episode.
 Note that this would makes the tagline "20 years from now" inaccurate, as that would make her 36 years old, and thus unqualified Constitutionally to have been elected. (minimum age is 35) However, "President of Earth" may have different qualifications.
 Ben 10,000: It turned out that Gwen was better at the day-to-day stuff.

President Trey Thompson
 President in CBS television series Salvation
 First African American President. 
 Holds a degree in mathematics and is a graduate of the United States Air Force Academy.
 Works for NASA for many years as a Space Shuttle pilot. 
 Goes into politics after retiring from NASA, and is elected to two terms as a congressman, enjoying an 80% approval rating in his district.
 Selected to become Vice President by President Darius Tanz. Chosen over Michigan Senator Mitch Gitlow due to his reputation as a "straight shooter" and willingness to confront President Tanz on issues when needed. 
 Ascends to the presidency under the provisions of the 25th Amendment when President Tanz resigns to devote his full-time to preventing the Samson asteroid from crashing to Earth. 
 Played by James Lesure

President Daniel Thompson
 President in Earth: Final Conflict.
 In the early 21st Century an alien race called the Ta'Lon arrive on Earth with a hidden agenda.
 President Thompson is supported by the Ta'Lon over industrialist Jonathan Doors, and is shot in a staged assassination attempt to ensure his re-election.
 Once re-elected President Thompson agrees to Ta'Lon instigating Martial Law.

President Thompson
 President in "The Third World War" by General Sir John Hackett (1978).
 A former Governor of South Carolina.
 A Conservative who defeats incumbent Vice President Walter Mondale in 1984 after President Jimmy Carter is elected to a second term.
 President during the sixteen-day Third World War which ends with the nuclear destruction of Birmingham in England, and Kyiv in the Soviet Union
 Party: Republican

Mr. Thompson
 President in: Atlas Shrugged
 Never actually referred to as President, only as Head of State, but the office is implied from context (he heads the government of the United States and is based in Washington D.C.).
Thompson presides over a series of socialist reforms (or at least, social-democratic) and attempts to compromise with John Galt, but Galt is not willing to do so. Galt offers that Thompson abolish Income Tax, but Thompson is not willing to do that. Eventually, due to Galt to taking away all the capable people on whom the economy depends, the United States collapses into total chaos and famine.
After which Galt and his friends would reconstruct it on a strict capitalist free enterprise base, and whoever survives the cataclysm will have to accept that. The ultimate personal fate of Thompson is not specified.

President Thomas Nathaniel Thorn
 President in several novels by Dale Brown
 Elected in 2000. First third party candidate to win since Lincoln.
 Notable for his "Fortress America" policy, in which he withdraws all troops deployed overseas and refuses to deploy troops unless America's interests are directly threatened.
 Also notable for strict adherence to the Constitution, e.g. ignores inauguration ceremony at Congress and does not appoint a National Security Advisor.
 Doesn't stand for re-election after a Russian nuclear attack on America.
 Party Affiliation: Jeffersonian (fictional third party)

President Thornton
 President in The Pooch and the Pauper, 2000 TV movie.
 Played by Fred Willard

President Zachary Thornton
 President in: Capital Mysteries by Ron Roy

President Daniel Churchill Thorpe
 President in the TV mini-series World War Three (1982)
 A hardline conservative, President Thorpe institutes a grain embargo of the Soviet Union.
 Dies in office, and is replaced by Thomas McKenna.

President Ragnar Thorvaldssen The Nine-Fingered
 President in The Viking President by Daniel K. Wheatley
 From an alternate history timeline in which the Norse colony of Vinland prospered and expanded southwards creating a series of colonies down what would have been the Eastern Coast of the US.
Overseen by the Grand Jarl, theoretically elected by the Folkmoot but in practice restricted to the Ericssons, descended (or at least claiming descent) from Eric the Red. The Vinlanders rejected Christianity, fiercely clinging to the Norse Religion. With the help of renegade Norwegian and Danish priests, that religion was made to emulate Christianity in many ways - gaining a codified theology centered on the Trinity of Odin, Frey and Thor, written Scriptures and a hierarchical priesthood. In that form, the Norse Religion re-established itself in much of Europe. With Vinland undergoing a rapid Industrial Revolution in the 16th Century (36th Century after the Creation of Valhalla by the Vinlandish Calendar) Vinland eventually became the unquestioned dominant world power, its religion widespread also in Asia and Africa. In 1785 (3751 AV) the scientist Hrodgar  Wulffensson discovered a means of accessing other alternate timelines, and soon Vinland embarked on systematically invading and annexing them. In 1862 Vinland launched a surprise attack on the United States, embroiled in the American Civil War. Among the invaders was Ragnar Thorvaldssen The Nine-Fingered, a capable Vinlandish middle-ranking officer descended from a distaff branch of the Ericsson Family, long in disfavor at the Jarl's court, who thus had little hope of promotion. Armed with tanks, fighter planes, energy weapons and nuclear arms, it took the invaders less than two months to overcome both the Union and Confederate armies and seize control of the entire US territory. Grown complacent and contemptuous of the "primitive locals", the victorious Vinlanders held a celebration at their headquarters - former headquarters of the Army of Northern Virginia - with  sentries tacitly allowed to imbibe considerable quantities of captured American whiskey. The fugitive Robert E. Lee seized the chance, launching a surprise night attack with the remnant of his forces, plus quite a few Union soldiers willing to accept his leadership in face of this calamity. Lee and his troops seized several of the Vinlanders' laser cannon, forced captives to explain their (quite simple) operation, and turned them on the Victory Celebration Pavilion - in one blow destroying the entire upper echelon of the Vinlandish invading force. It was Ragnar Thorvaldssen - one of the few Vinlandish officers to remain completely sober - who rallied the disorganized invading forces, brought their superior arms into play and defeated Lee and his troops. Interviewing the captured Lee, Thorvaldssen highly complimented him on his valor and initiative and then ordered him executed forthwith - as Lee had manifestly proven himself too dangerous to be allowed to live. With his authority accepted unquestionably by the invading force - but knowing that it would never be confirmed by the authorities back home - Thorvaldssen moved swiftly to establish a local power base. He got himself elected President of the United States - in a process falling short of free elections - and amended the US Constitution to allow two Vice Presidents, these positions being awarded to Abraham Lincoln and Jefferson Davis. The cream of the invading Vinlandish soldiers and officers were transferred to a recreated United States Army and set to instruct American recruits, from both North and South, in Vinlandish arms, tactics and strategy. High on Thorvaldssen's agenda was the issue of slavery, so disturbing to the people of his new country. Like Vinlanders in general, Thorvaldssen saw nothing wrong in slavery as such but thought it was unjust and outright ridiculous that only black-skinned people be slaves.  He solved the problem - at least to his own satisfaction - by freeing half of the black slaves and enslaving an equal number of whites, randomly chosen, to take their place. Himself a strong adherent of the god Thor and contemptuous of Christianity (of which only sorry vestiges remained in the world of his birth), President Thorvaldssen reluctantly decided that for the time being it would be impolitic to embark on any large-scale Norse missionary activity. Rather, priority was given to his next big project - conquest of the British Empire.

President Thurston
 President in: The Emberverse series, by S. M. Stirling.
 After the sudden failure of modern technology causes the collapse of society, Thurston - a former member of the US military - manages to set up a government in Boise, Idaho.
With himself as President he hopes to eventually re-unite the entire former territory of the US and refuses to recognize the numerous new nations which arose out of the chaos
Once proven wrong, however, he easily admits he is at fault. But when declaring the next President should be elected, he is assassinated by his son Martin Thurston, who sets himself up as President.

President Todd
 President in: Quantico
 He is kidnapped with the First Lady Elaine Todd by a terrorist group in the midst of a G-20 Summit.
The First Lady is eventually murdered during the kidnapping.
 A crisis is introduced, forcing the President to resign.
 Party: Unknown 
 Played by: Danny Johnson

President Rupert Justice Tolliver
 President in Rides a Pale Horse, a novel by Franklin Allen Lieb.
 Former minister and Governor of Texas.
 Defeats Vice President Sandman in the 2000 Election.
 Begins a military buildup, and a campaign against terrorist states.
 The same conspiracy that assassinated President Kennedy has the same assassin kill President Tolliver.
 Party: Republican

President John Tomarchio
 President in: Jericho (2006 TV series).
 As junior senator from Wyoming, Tomarchio belongs to a small group of U.S. government officials who survive a series of nuclear attacks on two dozen American cities.
 Originally one of six people competing for the presidency after the attacks, he eventually manages to become leader of the new Allied States of America (ASA), which contains most of the former U.S. territory west of the Mississippi.
 Tomarchio's increasingly authoritarian administration turns out to be infiltrated and controlled by the criminal Jennings & Rall company
 Towards the end of the series a Second American Civil War between the ASA and the other successor governments of the U.S. seems to be on the horizon.
 Played by: George Newbern.

President Averell Torrent
 President in: Empire, by Orson Scott Card
 Formerly a professor at Princeton University
 Is attributed throughout the book as being a moderate, with no real polarized political stance
 In an interview before the election Torrent is asked if he will run for the Republicans, the party for which he recently served as National Security Advisor, but he responds that he will only run for the presidency if elected in primaries by both parties (i.e., the Democrats and Republicans) which he eventually is.
 Elected in place of President Nielson near the end of the book

President Veronica Townshend
 President briefly referenced in Moonfall by Jack McDevitt
 A former economics professor from the University of Oregon, junior senator from Oregon, and Secretary of Education under the Hamlin administration.
 First female president
Wins the election of 2016 following the presidency of Andrew Culpepper.
 During her administration, the space shuttle Atlantis II is marooned in space after deflecting off of the Earth's atmosphere and goes careening towards the sun. The astronauts on-board remain in contact with NASA until their oxygen supply is fully depleted.
 Chooses not to run in the 2020 election, saying that it is "Not worth it." Her vice president is nominated but loses the election to Henry Kolladner.
 Returns to her home state of Oregon after leaving office.
 Opens her presidential library in 2022.
 Party: Republican

President Mary Rose Tremane
 President in Deadlands: Hell on Earth role playing game.
 Elected in 2078 on a platform of peaceful negotiation with the Confederate States of America.
 "Disappears" while traveling on Air Force One over the Rocky Mountains on January 1, 2081.

President Quentin Trembley III
 President in: Gravity Falls
 The "8 and a halfth" president. Retroactively renounces presidency for being too silly.
 He wins the presidential race due to his opponent being crushed in a landslide.
 Signs the "Depantsipation Proclamation" which bans pants. A play on words of the "Emancipation Proclamation".
 His state of the union speech is "The only thing we have to fear is gigantic, man-eating spiders!"
 After trying to eat the White House, Trembley is driven from office.
 His departure from the White House consists of him eating a salamander and then jumping out of a window.

President Melvin Trent
 President in the 1967 movie  In Like Flint
 Replaced with an actor double named Sebastian. 
 Played an Andrew Duggan

President Samuel Arthur Tresch
 President in: Mr. President (TV series, 1987–88)
 Played by: George C. Scott

President Allan Trumbull
 Speaker of the House and Acting President in: Olympus Has Fallen
Vice President and Acting President in: London has Fallen
President in: Angel Has Fallen
 As Speaker of the House of Representatives of the United States in 2013, takes temporary office during the invasion at the White House. The President and Vice President are hostages so he becomes Acting President.
 As Vice President in 2016, he remains in D.C. during the trip of President Asher to London for the funeral of Prime Minister of the United Kingdom.  The assassinations of key world leaders and the kidnapping of the President Asher force him to once again become Acting President.
 In 2019, he is officially President in his own right. He recommends Mike Banning (hero of the first two Has Fallen movies) to replace the Director of the Secret Service. A swarm of drones attacks him on a fishing trip, leaving Banning and a comatose Trumbull the only survivors. 
 Trumbull wakes up some time later. It is revealed that his VP is a conspirator in the attack. Banning is exonerated and Trumbull's VP arrested. 
 Trumbull may appear in the upcoming continuation of the franchise, Night has Fallen. 
 Played by: Morgan Freeman

President Harrison Tucker
 President in: The First Lady (2018), a novel by James Patterson and Brendan DuBois
 Former Senator and Governor of Ohio
 Has an affair with a lobbyist of the defense industry
 His wive gets kidnapped in the book due to an intrigue of his chief of staff, Parker Hoyt, and has to be saved by the Secret Service

President Thomas Nelson Tucker
 President in: The White House Mess (book) by Christopher Buckley
 Former Governor of Idaho.
 Marries former movie star Jessica Heath Tucker, and has one son Thomas Jr..
 Serves from 1989 to 1993.
 Attempts to give part of the Southwest U.S. to Mexico as a goodwill gesture, normalizes relations with Cuba, deals with a hostage crisis in Bermuda, and gets the U.S. Virgin Islands admitted as the 51st State.
 Loses to George H. W. Bush in 1992 in a landslide.
 Party: Democratic

President Rexford Tugwell
 President in: The Grasshopper Lies Heavy, which is in turn a work of fiction in the alternate history The Man in the High Castle (book) by Philip K. Dick; almost certainly based on the real Rexford Guy Tugwell.

President Turner
 President in: Ekipa, Polish political drama.
 Frequently mentioned in one episode "Dalej idziesz sam", during a crisis with nuclear testing in Belarus. Although he is not seen, his voice is heard when he speaks to the Polish Prime Minister via phone.

President Douglas Turner
 President in: The Case of the President by austrian author Marc Elsberg.
 A former President, who, three years after leaving office, is arrested in Athens, Greece on behalf of the International Criminal Court for committing illegal drone strikes in Syria.
 His prosecution causes international diplomatic unrest and US Military members try to free him from prison by force to prevent his conviction in The Hague.
 He could be based on Donald Trump since he shares the same initials with him.

President Madeline Turner
 President in: The Edge of Honor and Power Curve by Richard Herman

President William Turner
 President in World Without US Documentary
 Advocates a complete withdrawal of US Military Forces from around the world, and a massive cut to the US Defense Budget.
 President during the Chinese Nuclear Attack on Japan.

President John P. Tweedledee
 President in: Let 'Em Eat Cake by George and Ira Gershwin
 Defeats incumbent John P. Wintergreen, who fails to convince the Supreme Court to nullify the election results.
 Overthrown by Wintergreen and his Blue Shirts on July 4.
 Becomes President of Cuba.

President Twigg
 President in DAG, 2001 NBC TV series.
 Wife is named Katherine, nicknamed "Mrs. President."
 Followed by President Whitman.

President Andrew Tyler
 President in: Fourteen Points
 Term in Office: 2032–2040.
 Former Congressman from California (2018–2028).
 Former Vice President under President Newton (2028–2032).
 Stanford University attendee.
 Leaves office with a 67% approval rating.
 Most likely a moderate Democrat.

President Duncan Tyler
 President in the 1980 film Hangar 18
 During his re-election campaign a UFO is captured.

President Helen Tyler
 President in Modus (TV series)
 First female president
 Succeeds Barack Obama
 Married to First Gentleman Dale Tyler, and has one daughter, Zoe.
 Goes missing whilst staying in Admiralty House whilst on a state visit to Stockholm, Sweden.
 Secret Service codename: Evergreen
 Political party: Likely Democrat
 Portrayed by: Kim Cattrall

References

Lists of fictional presidents of the United States